

Cassoeula, sometimes Italianized as cassola, cazzuola or cazzola (Western Lombard word for "trowel", etymologically unrelated), or bottaggio (probably derived from the French word ) is a typical winter dish popular in Western Lombardy. The dish has a strong, decisive flavour, and was a favourite of conductor Arturo Toscanini. One writer describes it as a "noble, ancient Milanese dish", and writes of the inexpressible "pleasure that it furnishes the soul as well as the palate, especially on a wintry day".

Origins
One account of the origins of the dish associates it with the January 17 celebration of St Anthony the Abbot which coincided with the end of the pig-slaughtering season. The parts of the pig used for the dish were those ready for consumption immediately after slaughter, whereas the better cuts of meat would be hung to improve the flavour.

Another account traces the origins of the dish to the 16th century when Spain ruled Milan; it tells how a Spanish army officer taught the recipe to his lover, who cooked for a noble Milanese family, and the dish was well-received and became popular.

Ingredients
The meat used in the dish includes mainly pork meat (usually least valuable parts like ribs, rind, head, trotters, ears, nose and tail), Verzino sausage, and sometimes other meats like chicken and goose. These are cooked in a casserole (hence its name) with ingredients such as onion, carrot, celery and black pepper for about two and a half hours, after which the cabbage is added and cooking continues for a further half-hour.

Usually, cassoeula is served with polenta and/or a strong red wine. It is tradition for this dish to be eaten starting after the first frost of the season, to let the cabbage be softer and tastier.

Variations
Many variations of this dish exist across the territory, but all of them share the use of cabbage.
For example, in the Province of Como the head is used, but not the trotters; in the Province of Pavia only the ribs are used; and in the Province of Novara goose is added.

References

Cuisine of Lombardy
Pork dishes